The Juneau-Douglas City Museum is located at the corner of 4th and Main, opposite the Alaska State Capitol in Juneau, Alaska.  It occupies a building which was built in 1950–51 to house the Juneau Memorial Library.  It is a two-story Classical Revival structure built out of concrete with red marble trim elements.  A gable-roofed projecting section at the center of the long wall provides the main entrance, which is recessed in an opening the full height to the pediment.  This projecting section is flanked by banks of five metal-framed awning windows.  The northeast facade has a gable pediment similar to that of the entry projection, below which is a large rectangular window, behind which a stained glass decoration has been installed.  The building served the city as its library until the 1980s, at which time it was repurposed to house the city museum.

The museum's exhibits include gold mining, hydropower, skiing, outdoor recreation, fishing, politics and city history.

The building was listed on the National Register of Historic Places in 2006.

See also
National Register of Historic Places listings in Juneau, Alaska

References

External links

 Juneau-Douglas City Museum website

Buildings and structures completed in 1951
History museums in Alaska
Museums in Juneau, Alaska
Neoclassical architecture in Alaska